Vasona Reservoir is an artificial lake located in Los Gatos, California, United States.  A  county park surrounds the reservoir and provides limited fishing ("catch and release"), picnicking, and informal play activities. Although swimming is not allowed, human-powered boating is permitted in the reservoir.

History 
The reservoir was formed by the Vasona Percolating Dam, built in 1935 across Los Gatos Creek. It is the smallest reservoir owned by the Santa Clara Valley Water District.

Albert August Vollmer, who came to the area in 1887, named the area after a pony he had had as a child.

Vasona Dam 
New gates were installed in the dam in 1997.

Vasona Lake County Park 
Vasona Lake County Park is one of 28 Santa Clara County Parks. The  park surrounds the reservoir, with Oak Meadow Park adjacent to the west. The reservoir offers fishing for black bass, crappie, catfish and bluegill.

See also 
List of dams and reservoirs in California
List of lakes in California
List of lakes in the San Francisco Bay Area

References 

Embankment dams
Dams in California
Los Gatos, California
Reservoirs in Santa Clara County, California
United States local public utility dams
Dams completed in 1935
Reservoirs in California
Reservoirs in Northern California